Yen Shui-long (5 June 1903 – 24 September 1997) was a Taiwanese painter and sculptor, was born in Ensuikō Chō, Japanese Taiwan (modern-day Xiaying, Tainan, Taiwan).

Early life
By the he was thirteen, both of Yen's parents, as well as his grandmother, had died. His older sister had married, so Yen had to take care of himself. After completing two years of training at the Tainan Teachers’ Training School (台南州教員養成所) in 1918, Yen was hired as the youngest schoolteacher at the public elementary school in present-day Xiaying District. A fellow teacher convinced Yen to pursue art in Japan, and he subsequently enrolled in the Kaei Public School (Kaei Kōgakkō). He went to Japan in 1920, and was admitted into the Western Painting Division of the Tokyo School of Fine Arts two years later. By 1927, he entered graduate school at the same institute to study under Fujishima Takeji, Okada Saburousuke, and Wada Eisaku. He returned to Taiwan in 1929 and held a solo exhibition to raise funds for further studies in Paris. Yen's further education in art was partly funded by Lin Hsien-tang.

By introduction, he studied under Kees van Dongen at the Académie d’Art Moderne. While studying in France, he applied for permission from the Louvre to copy famous works by artists such as Titian and Ingres, and his work was selected into the Salon d’Automne in 1931.

Work and Public Life
However, he became afflicted with hepatitis as a result of overwork and poor nutrition. In order to recover, he returned to Taiwan in October 1932. In 1934, he and other artists, such as Tan Ting-pho, founded the Tai-Yang Art Society (臺陽美術協會). Starting in 1936, Yen devoted himself to the promotion of arts and crafts. In 1941, he and other artists, including Zhang Wanchuan (張萬傳) and Chen Dewang (陳德旺), founded the Taiwan Plastic Arts Society (台灣造形美術協會). He also devoted himself to the pursuit of art and craft skills, such as straw basket weaving and bamboo-processing work.

Over the course of his life, he taught at Taiwan Provincial Tainan Junior College of Technology (台南工業專門學校; today’s National Cheng Kung University), National Taiwan Academy of Arts (today’s National Taiwan University of Arts), Private Tainan School of Home Economics, and Shih Chien School of Home Economics (today’s Shih Chien University). In addition, he also wrote the book Taiwan’s Arts and Crafts (1952).

Although his focus shifted to arts and crafts, Yen continued to produce oil paintings as well. His paintings are in a realist style, with succinctly formed objects in strong and contrasting warm colors. The dominant themes of his works include still lifes, landscapes, and figures. A series of his works with Orchid Island as their primary theme were especially famous.

Yen Shui-long also worked in advertisement design. Between 1933 and 1940, he painted commercial advertisements for Osaka Smoca Tooth Powder Company. These works were later collected in a series that became a classic exemplar of Japanese advertising design in the 1930s.

Contributions to art
Aside from his advertisement designs, Yen Shui-long left behind many mosaic works. One of the most famous mosaics was his From Agricultural to Industrial Society at Jiantan Park. His work Sunflower can also be found on the walls of the Taiyang Tang Bakery in Taichung. In addition, Yen accepted a commission to help with the beautification of Taipei City landmarks such as Zhongshan Hall and the façade of the Sun Yat-sen Memorial Hall, which set a precedent for Taiwanese public art and landscape design.

Between 1933 and 1944, he returned to Japan, worked on advertising design and applied arts. Yen resided in Taiwan again later, and became a teacher of Tainan Technical College (now National Cheng Kung University).

Yen made a series of mosaic art works after 1961. And he also created many art works that contain some motifs about Taiwanese aborigines. In 1984, Yen resigned from Shih Chien College of Home Economics (now Shih Chien University). In his old age, Yen worked mainly on painting, drawing, other visual arts and his personal exhibitions. He worked long hours to prepare for a 1997 retrospective meant to celebrate his 95th birthday. While working, he slipped and fell in a bathroom, resulting in a bone fracture that required surgery. Yen died of surgical complications before work for the planned exhibition was completed.

References

External links

slyen.org - the original (and official) English site about Yen Shui-long.

Taiwanese sculptors
Taiwanese people of Hoklo descent
1903 births
1997 deaths
Artists from Tainan
20th-century Taiwanese painters
Taiwanese expatriates in France
Academic staff of the National Cheng Kung University
Academic staff of the National Taiwan University of Arts
Academic staff of Shih Chien University
Taiwanese schoolteachers
Advertising artists and illustrators
20th-century Taiwanese educators